The Compagnie Internationale des Grands Hôtels (CIGH) was founded on 11 April 1894 as a subsidiary of the railway company Compagnie Internationale des Wagons-Lits (CIWL). This hotel chain was established to provide the customers of CIWL with high quality accommodation before or after their train journey.

History 
Georges Nagelmackers created the Compagnie Internationale des Grands Hotels to develop and operate luxury hotels throughout its trains' routes. Three hotels already operated by CIWL before 1894 were integrated in the hotel chain.

The CIGH operated most of King Ismail's palaces in Egypt before his abdication in 1879. It then remodeled the Gezirah Palace and opened it in 1894. The CIGH's instant expansion throughout Europe made it the first international hotel chain.

The CIGH had operated successfully for twenty years when World War I heavily affected the hotel business. CIGH had to sell or close many hotels and at the end of  World War I only four hotels were operated by CIGH. After World War I the CIGH wasn't regarded as a core business and it wasn't until after World War II that the hotel business was revived.

Properties 

Details and changes are in the article regarding the hotel.

See also 
 Compagnie Internationale des Wagons-Lits
 Georges Nagelmackers

References 
 A. Mühl, 125 Jahre/Ans/Years CIWL, Freiburg 1998

Hotel chains